Fillstabäcken Nature Reserve is a nature reserve in Jämtland County in Sweden. It is part of the EU-wide Natura 2000-network.

The nature reserve contains Sweden's most extensive area of tufa, formed by a spring that has deposited calcium carbonate here for around 5,000 years. The spring and tufa is surrounded by an area of forest, and contains several unusual plant species such as fly orchid, birds-eye primrose, Scottish asphodel, fragrant orchid, Pedicularis sceptrum-carolinum and Carex flava and its subspecies jemtlandica.

References

Nature reserves in Sweden
Natura 2000 in Sweden
Tourist attractions in Jämtland County
Geography of Jämtland County
Protected areas established in 1988
1988 establishments in Sweden